The 2012–13 Four Hills Tournament was held at the four traditional venues of Oberstdorf, Garmisch-Partenkirchen, Innsbruck and Bischofshofen, located in Germany and Austria, between 29 December 2012 and 6 January 2013.

Overall standings
The final standings after the four events. Gregor Schlierenzauer was the overall winner.

Oberstdorf
 HS 137 Schattenbergschanze, Germany
30 December 2012

Garmisch-Partenkirchen
 HS 137 Große Olympiaschanze, Germany
1 January 2013

Innsbruck
 HS 130 Bergiselschanze, Austria
4 January 2013

Bischofshofen
 HS 140 Paul-Ausserleitner-Schanze, Austria
6 January 2013

See also 
 2012–13 FIS Ski Jumping World Cup

References

External links 
 Official website 

Four Hills Tournament
Four Hills Tournament, 2012-13
Four Hills Tournament, 2012-13
Four Hills Tournament, 2012-13
Four Hills Tournament, 2012-13
Four Hills Tournament
Four Hills Tournament
Four Hills Tournament